Firuz Kola-ye Olya may refer to:
 Firuz Kola-ye Olya, Amol
 Firuz Kola-ye Olya, Nowshahr